Onkaparinga is a defunct electoral district that elected members to the House of Assembly, the lower house of the bicameral legislature of the Australian state of South Australia. It was established in 1857, abolished in 1902; re-established in 1938 and abolished again in 1970. It was named after the Onkaparinga River.

Members

Election results

References

Former Members of the Parliament of South Australia

Former electoral districts of South Australia
1857 establishments in Australia
1902 disestablishments in Australia
1938 establishments in Australia
1970 disestablishments in Australia